The Centralia Correctional Center  is a medium-security state prison for men located in Centralia, Clinton County, Illinois, owned and operated by the Illinois Department of Corrections.  

The facility was first opened in 1980, and has a working capacity of 1572.

References

Prisons in Illinois
Buildings and structures in Marion County, Illinois
1980 establishments in Illinois